A Van Allen radiation belt is a zone of energetic charged particles, most of which originate from the solar wind, that are captured by and held around a planet by that planet's magnetosphere. Earth has two such belts, and sometimes others may be temporarily created. The belts are named after James Van Allen, who is credited with their discovery. Most of the particles that form the belts are thought to come from solar wind and other particles by cosmic rays. By trapping the solar wind, the magnetic field deflects those energetic particles and protects the atmosphere from destruction.

The belts are in the inner region of Earth's magnetic field. The belts trap energetic electrons and protons. Other nuclei, such as alpha particles, are less prevalent. The belts endanger satellites, which must have their sensitive components protected with adequate shielding if they spend significant time near that zone. In 2013, the Van Allen Probes detected a transient, third radiation belt, which persisted for four weeks. Apollo Astronauts going through the Van Allen Belts received a very low and non-harmful dose of radiation.

Discovery
Kristian Birkeland, Carl Størmer, Nicholas Christofilos, and Enrico Medi had investigated the possibility of trapped charged particles before the Space Age. Explorer 1 and Explorer 3 confirmed the existence of the belt in early 1958 under James Van Allen at the University of Iowa. The trapped radiation was first mapped by Explorer 4, Pioneer 3, and Luna 1.

The term Van Allen belts refers specifically to the radiation belts surrounding Earth; however, similar radiation belts have been discovered around other planets. The Sun does not support long-term radiation belts, as it lacks a stable, global dipole field. The Earth's atmosphere limits the belts' particles to regions above 200–1,000 km, (124–620 miles) while the belts do not extend past 8 Earth radii RE. The belts are confined to a volume which extends about 65° on either side of the celestial equator.

Research

The NASA Van Allen Probes mission aims at understanding (to the point of predictability) how populations of relativistic electrons and ions in space form or change in response to changes in solar activity and the solar wind.
NASA Institute for Advanced Concepts–funded studies have proposed magnetic scoops to collect antimatter that naturally occurs in the Van Allen belts of Earth, although only about 10 micrograms of antiprotons are estimated to exist in the entire belt.

The Van Allen Probes mission successfully launched on August 30, 2012. The primary mission was scheduled to last two years with expendables expected to last four. The probes were deactivated in 2019 after running out of fuel and are expected to deorbit during the 2030s. NASA's Goddard Space Flight Center manages the Living With a Star program—of which the Van Allen Probes were a project, along with Solar Dynamics Observatory (SDO). The Applied Physics Laboratory was responsible for the implementation and instrument management for the Van Allen Probes.

Radiation belts exist around other planets and moons in the solar system that have magnetic fields powerful enough to sustain them. To date, most of these radiation belts have been poorly mapped. The Voyager Program (namely Voyager 2) only nominally confirmed the existence of similar belts around Uranus and Neptune.

Geomagnetic storms can cause electron density to increase or decrease relatively quickly (i.e., approximately one day or less). Longer-timescale processes determine the overall configuration of the belts. After electron injection increases electron density, electron density is often observed to decay exponentially. Those decay time constants are called "lifetimes." Measurements from the Van Allen Probe B's Magnetic Electron Ion Spectrometer (MagEIS) show long electron lifetimes (i.e., longer than 100 days) in the inner belt; short electron lifetimes of around one or two days are observed in the "slot" between the belts; and energy-dependent electron lifetimes of roughly five to 20 days are found in the outer belt.

Inner belt 

In certain cases, when solar activity is stronger or in geographical areas such as the South Atlantic Anomaly, the inner boundary may decline to roughly 200 km above the Earth's surface. The inner belt contains high concentrations of electrons in the range of hundreds of keV and energetic protons with energies exceeding 100 MeV—trapped by the relatively strong magnetic fields in the region (as compared to the outer belt).

It is believed that proton energies exceeding 50 MeV in the lower belts at lower altitudes are the result of the beta decay of neutrons created by cosmic ray collisions with nuclei of the upper atmosphere. The source of lower energy protons is believed to be proton diffusion, due to changes in the magnetic field during geomagnetic storms.

Due to the slight offset of the belts from Earth's geometric center, the inner Van Allen belt makes its closest approach to the surface at the South Atlantic Anomaly.

In March 2014, a pattern resembling "zebra stripes" was observed in the radiation belts by the Radiation Belt Storm Probes Ion Composition Experiment (RBSPICE) onboard Van Allen Probes. The initial theory proposed in 2014 was that—due to the tilt in Earth's magnetic field axis—the planet's rotation generated an oscillating, weak electric field that permeates through the entire inner radiation belt. A 2016 study instead concluded that the zebra stripes were an imprint of ionospheric winds on radiation belts.

Outer belt

The outer belt consists mainly of high-energy (0.1–10 MeV) electrons trapped by the Earth's magnetosphere. It is more variable than the inner belt, as it is more easily influenced by solar activity. It is almost toroidal in shape, beginning at an altitude of 3 Earth radii and extending to 10 Earth radii (RE)— above the Earth's surface. Its greatest intensity is usually around 4 to 5 RE. The outer electron radiation belt is mostly produced by inward radial diffusion and local acceleration due to transfer of energy from whistler-mode plasma waves to radiation belt electrons. Radiation belt electrons are also constantly removed by collisions with Earth's atmosphere, losses to the magnetopause, and their outward radial diffusion. The gyroradii of energetic protons would be large enough to bring them into contact with the Earth's atmosphere. Within this belt, the electrons have a high flux and at the outer edge (close to the magnetopause), where geomagnetic field lines open into the geomagnetic "tail", the flux of energetic electrons can drop to the low interplanetary levels within about —a decrease by a factor of 1,000.

In 2014, it was discovered that the inner edge of the outer belt is characterized by a very sharp transition, below which highly relativistic electrons (> 5MeV) cannot penetrate. The reason for this shield-like behavior is not well understood.

The trapped particle population of the outer belt is varied, containing electrons and various ions. Most of the ions are in the form of energetic protons, but a certain percentage are alpha particles and O+ oxygen ions—similar to those in the ionosphere but much more energetic. This mixture of ions suggests that ring current particles probably originate from more than one source.

The outer belt is larger than the inner belt, and its particle population fluctuates widely. Energetic (radiation) particle fluxes can increase and decrease dramatically in response to geomagnetic storms, which are themselves triggered by magnetic field and plasma disturbances produced by the Sun. The increases are due to storm-related injections and acceleration of particles from the tail of the magnetosphere. Another cause of variability of the outer belt particle populations is the wave-particle interactions with various plasma waves in a broad range of frequencies. 

On February 28, 2013, a third radiation belt—consisting of high-energy ultrarelativistic charged particles—was reported to be discovered. In a news conference by NASA's Van Allen Probe team, it was stated that this third belt is a product of coronal mass ejection from the Sun. It has been represented as a separate creation which splits the Outer Belt, like a knife, on its outer side, and exists separately as a storage container of particles for a month's time, before merging once again with the Outer Belt.

The unusual stability of this third, transient belt has been explained as due to a 'trapping' by the Earth's magnetic field of ultrarelativistic particles as they are lost from the second, traditional outer belt. While the outer zone, which forms and disappears over a day, is highly variable due to interactions with the atmosphere, the ultrarelativistic particles of the third belt are thought not to scatter into the atmosphere, as they are too energetic to interact with atmospheric waves at low latitudes. This absence of scattering and the trapping allows them to persist for a long time, finally only being destroyed by an unusual event, such as the shock wave from the Sun.

Flux values 
In the belts, at a given point, the flux of particles of a given energy decreases sharply with energy.

At the magnetic equator, electrons of energies exceeding 5000 keV (resp. 5 MeV) have omnidirectional fluxes ranging from 1.2×106 (resp. 3.7×104) up to 9.4×109 (resp. 2×107) particles per square centimeter per second.

The proton belts contain protons with kinetic energies ranging from about 100 keV, which can penetrate 0.6 µm of lead,  to over 400 MeV, which can penetrate 143 mm of lead.

Most published flux values for the inner and outer belts may not show the maximum probable flux densities that are possible in the belts. There is a reason for this discrepancy: the flux density and the location of the peak flux is variable, depending primarily on solar activity, and the number of spacecraft with instruments observing the belt in real time has been limited. The Earth has not experienced a solar storm of Carrington event intensity and duration, while spacecraft with the proper instruments have been available to observe the event.

Radiation levels in the belts would be dangerous to humans if they were exposed for an extended period of time. The Apollo missions minimised hazards for astronauts by sending spacecraft at high speeds through the thinner areas of the upper belts, bypassing inner belts completely, except for the Apollo 14 mission where the spacecraft traveled through the heart of the trapped radiation belts.

Antimatter confinement
In 2011, a study confirmed earlier speculation that the Van Allen belt could confine antiparticles. The Payload for Antimatter Matter Exploration and Light-nuclei Astrophysics (PAMELA) experiment detected levels of antiprotons orders of magnitude higher than are expected from normal particle decays while passing through the South Atlantic Anomaly. This suggests the Van Allen belts confine a significant flux of antiprotons produced by the interaction of the Earth's upper atmosphere with cosmic rays. The energy of the antiprotons has been measured in the range from 60 to 750 MeV.

Research funded by the NASA Institute for Advanced Concepts concluded that harnessing these antiprotons for spacecraft propulsion would be feasible. Researchers believed that this approach would have advantages over antiproton generation at CERN because collecting the particles in situ eliminates transportation losses and costs. Jupiter and Saturn are also possible sources, but the Earth belt is the most productive. Jupiter is less productive than might be expected due to magnetic shielding from cosmic rays of much of its atmosphere. In 2019, CMS announced that the construction of a device that would be capable of collecting these particles has already begun. NASA will use this device to collect these particles and transport them to institutes all around the world for further examination. These so-called "antimatter containers" could be used for industrial purposes as well in the future.

Implications for space travel

Spacecraft travelling beyond low Earth orbit enter the zone of radiation of the Van Allen belts. Beyond the belts, they face additional hazards from cosmic rays and solar particle events. A region between the inner and outer Van Allen belts lies at 2 to 4 Earth radii and is sometimes referred to as the "safe zone".

Solar cells, integrated circuits, and sensors can be damaged by radiation. Geomagnetic storms occasionally damage electronic components on spacecraft. Miniaturization and digitization of electronics and logic circuits have made satellites more vulnerable to radiation, as the total electric charge in these circuits is now small enough so as to be comparable with the charge of incoming ions. Electronics on satellites must be hardened against radiation to operate reliably. The Hubble Space Telescope, among other satellites, often has its sensors turned off when passing through regions of intense radiation. A satellite shielded by 3 mm of aluminium in an elliptic orbit passing the radiation belts will receive about 2,500 rem (25 Sv) per year. (For comparison, a full-body dose of 5 Sv is deadly.) Almost all radiation will be received while passing the inner belt.

The Apollo missions marked the first event where humans traveled through the Van Allen belts, which was one of several radiation hazards known by mission planners. The astronauts had low exposure in the Van Allen belts due to the short period of time spent flying through them.

Astronauts' overall exposure was actually dominated by solar particles once outside Earth's magnetic field. The total radiation received by the astronauts varied from mission-to-mission but was measured to be between 0.16 and 1.14 rads (1.6 and 11.4 mGy), much less than the standard of 5 rem (50 mSv) per year set by the United States Atomic Energy Commission for people who work with radioactivity.

Causes
It is generally understood that the inner and outer Van Allen belts result from different processes. The inner belt is mainly composed of energetic protons produced from the decay of so-called "albedo" neutrons, which are themselves the result of cosmic ray collisions in the upper atmosphere. The outer Van Allen belt consists mainly of electrons. They are injected from the geomagnetic tail following geomagnetic storms, and are subsequently energized through wave-particle interactions.

In the inner belt, particles that originate from the Sun are trapped in the Earth's magnetic field. Particles spiral along the magnetic lines of flux as they move "latitudinally" along those lines. As particles move toward the poles, the magnetic field line density increases, and their "latitudinal" velocity is slowed and can be reversed, deflecting the particles back towards the equatorial region, causing them to bounce back and forth between the Earth's poles. In addition to both spiralling around and moving along the flux lines, the electrons drift slowly in an eastward direction, while the protons drift westward.

The gap between the inner and outer Van Allen belts is sometimes called the "safe zone" or "safe slot", and is the location of medium Earth orbits. The gap is caused by the VLF radio waves, which scatter particles in pitch angle, which adds new ions to the atmosphere. Solar outbursts can also dump particles into the gap, but those drain out in a matter of days. The VLF radio waves were previously thought to be generated by turbulence in the radiation belts, but recent work by J.L. Green of the Goddard Space Flight Center compared maps of lightning activity collected by the Microlab 1 spacecraft with data on radio waves in the radiation-belt gap from the IMAGE spacecraft; the results suggest that the radio waves are actually generated by lightning within Earth's atmosphere. The generated radio waves strike the ionosphere at the correct angle to pass through only at high latitudes, where the lower ends of the gap approach the upper atmosphere. These results are still being debate in the scientific community.

Proposed removal
Draining the charged particles from the Van Allen belts would open up new orbits for satellites and make travel safer for astronauts.

High Voltage Orbiting Long Tether, or HiVOLT, is a concept proposed by Russian physicist V. V. Danilov and further refined by Robert P. Hoyt and Robert L. Forward for draining and removing the radiation fields of the Van Allen radiation belts that surround the Earth.

Another proposal for draining the Van Allen belts involves beaming very-low-frequency (VLF) radio waves from the ground into the Van Allen belts.

Draining radiation belts around other planets has also been proposed, for example, before exploring Europa, which orbits within Jupiter's radiation belt.

As of 2014, it remains uncertain if there are any negative unintended consequences to removing these radiation belts.

See also
 Dipole model of the Earth's magnetic field
 L-shell
 List of artificial radiation belts
 List of plasma (physics) articles
 Space weather

Explanatory notes

Citations

Additional sources
 
 
  Part I: Radial transport, pp. 1679–1693, ; Part II: Local acceleration and loss, pp. 1694–1713, .

External links 

 An explanation of the belts by David P. Stern and Mauricio Peredo
 Background: Trapped particle radiation models—Introduction to the trapped radiation belts by SPENVIS
 SPENVIS—Space Environment, Effects, and Education System—Gateway to the SPENVIS orbital dose calculation software
The Van Allen Probes Web Site Johns Hopkins University Applied Physics Laboratory

1958 in science
Articles containing video clips
Geomagnetism
Space physics
Space plasmas